Hambou is a village on the island of Grande Comore (Ngazidja) in the Comoros. According to the 1991 census, the village had a population of 753.

Dawiat Mohamed has been a member of the Assembly of the Union of the Comoros for Hambou since 2020.

References

Populated places in Grande Comore